The 18th Vietnam Film Festival was held from October 14 to October 16, 2013 in Hạ Long City, Quảng Ninh Province, Vietnam, with the slogan "Vietnamese Cinema - Ethnicity, Humanity, Creativity, Integration" (Vietnamese: "Điện ảnh Việt Nam - Dân tộc, Nhân văn, Sáng tạo, Hội nhập").

Event 
The Film Festival was held in the year that celebrates 60 Years since Uncle Hồ signed the Decree of Establishing the Vietnam Revolutionary Film Industry. It had an outstanding number of entries compared to other film festivals.

At the end of the film festival, the Golden Lotus Award was given to all categories: "Bò vàng" (Animated Film), "Bí mật từ những pho tượng Phật" (Science Film), "Có một cơ hội bị bỏ lỡ" (Documentary film), "Người cộng sự" (Direct-to-video Feature film), "Những người viết huyền thoại" and "Scandal: Bí mật thảm đỏ" (Feature film).

Participation 
The 18th Vietnam Film Festival has the participation of 44 cinema establishments across the country with 139 films. In which, there are 23 feature films, 6 direct-to-video feature films, 10 documentary feature films, 62 direct-to-video documentary, 12 science films, and 26 animated films.

Films released after the 17th Vietnam Film Festival until the submission deadline of September 5, 2013 are eligible to participate.

Jury 
The 18th Vietnam Film Festival has 3 jury panels for feature films; documentary - science films and animated films. Each panel will vote by secret ballot to propose the award decision for each type of film according to regulations. Members of the Jury voted for all the awards as prescribed in the 18th Vietnam Film Festival's Charter and scored as follows: Golden Lotus - score 9.1 to 10; Silver Lotus - score 8.1 to 9.0; Jury Prize - score 7.1 to 8.0; Movie not voted - score below 7.1.

In the feature film category, there are 9 members of the jury chaired by director Đào Bá Sơn. Other members are: writer Chu Lai, screenwriter Đinh Thiên Phúc, director Hồ Quang Minh, cinematographer Phạm Thanh Hà, painter Nguyễn Trung Phan, composer Đỗ Hồng Quân, actress Nguyễn Lan Hương, director Hoàng Anh. 

In the documentary and science category, there are 7 members of the jury chaired by director Đặng Xuân Hải. Other members are: screenwriter Đoàn Minh Tuấn, director Vũ Thị Lệ Mỹ, director Lê Hồng Chương, director Bùi Đắc Ngôn, director Trần Tuấn Hiệp, journalist Tô Hoàng.

In the animated film category, there are 5 members of the jury chaired by director/animator Nguyễn Thị Phương Hoa. Other members are: writer Trần Ninh Hồ, director Đào Minh Uyển, musician Doãn Nguyên, journalist Chu Thu Hằng.

Activities 
To prepare for the 18th Vietnam Film Festival, the Organizing Committee organized "Welcome Film Week of the XVIII Vietnam Film Festival" taking place from September 23, 2013 to September 29, 2013 in Hanoi, Da Nang and Ho Chi Minh City (Hanoi: at the National Cinema Center, 87 Láng Hạ; Đà Nẵng: at Lê Độ Theater, 46 Trần Phú; Hồ Chí Minh City: at Galaxy Cinema Kinh Dương Vương, 718bis Kinh Dương Vương, District 6). This is also the time when the "unknowns" are released and answered before the audience before the 18th Vietnam Film Festival takes place.

During the three days of the festival, besides the opening, closing and awarding ceremonies, film artists will participate in the following activities:
Doing charity at the Center for the Protection of Children with Special Circumstances in Quảng Ninh Province
 Exchange with workers of Cửa Ông Coal Recruitment Company; officers and soldiers of Quảng Ninh province.
 Seminar "Cinema with Quảng Ninh and tourism promotion through cinema" (Vietnamese: "Điện ảnh với Quảng Ninh và quảng bá du lịch qua điện ảnh")
 Seminar "Development of film production and distribution cooperation" (Vietnamese: "Phát triển hợp tác sản xuất và phát hành phim")

The film festival organizers also cooperated with Quảng Ninh Department of Culture, Sports and Tourism to open the exhibition "Cinema with Quảng Ninh" displaying images from typical films about the land and people of Quảng Ninh.

The Opening Ceremony was broadcast live on VTV1 channel at 20:00 on October 12 and the Closing/Awarding Ceremony was broadcast live on VTV2 channel at 20:00 on October 15. The general director of both ceremonies is director Le Quý Dương.

Inadequacy 
From a professional perspective and event organization, the 18th Vietnam Film Festival is considered to be quite pale and inadequate. The place where the opening and closing night took place, although in an international amusement park, was narrow, with few spectators, most of which were officials and artists.

Side activities have not yet made a strong impression on people who are interested in cinema with seminars that lack novelty on "coordination of film production and distribution", "promotion of tourism through cinema". The cinemas are small (both Hạ Long theater and Phương Nam theater have about 200 seats each), the sound system is not really perfect.

Official Selection

Feature film 

Highlighted title indicates Golden Lotus winner.

Awards

Feature film

Direct-to-video

Documentary/Science film

Documentary film

Science film

Animated film

References 

Vietnam Film Festival
Vietnam Film Festival
Vietnam Film Festival
2013 in Vietnam